Saqaliba (singular ) is a term used in medieval Arabic sources to refer to Slavs and other peoples of Central, Southern, and Eastern Europe, or in a broad sense to European slaves. The term originates from the Middle Greek slavos/sklavenos (Slav), which in Hispano-Arabic came to designate first Slavic slaves and then, similarly to the semantic development of the term in other West-European languages, foreign slaves in general. The word was often used to refer specifically to Slavic slaves, but it could also refer more broadly to Europeans traded by the Arab traders.

There were several major routes for the trading of Slavic slaves into the Arab world: through Central Asia (Mongols, Tatars, Khazars, etc.) for the East Slavs; through the Balkans for the South Slavs; through Central and Western Europe for the West Slavs and to al-Andalus. The Volga trade route and other European routes, according to Ibrahim ibn Jakub (10th century), were serviced by Radanite Jewish merchants. (Compare Crimean–Nogai raids into East Slavic lands.) Theophanes mentions that the Umayyad caliph Muawiyah I settled a whole army of 5,000 Slavic mercenaries in Syria in the 660s. After the battle of Sebastopolis in 692, Neboulos, archon of the Slavic corps in the Byzantine army, and 30,000 of his men were settled by the Umayyads in the region of Syria.

In the Arab world, the Saqaliba served or were forced to serve in a multitude of ways: as servants, harem concubines, eunuchs, craftsmen, mercenaries, slave soldiers, and as Caliph's guards. In Iberia, Morocco, Damascus and Sicily, their military role may be compared with that of mamluks in the Ottoman Empire. In al-Andalus, Slavic eunuchs were so popular and widely distributed that they became synonymous with the term Saqāliba, though not all Saqaliba were eunuchs.
Some Saqāliba became rulers of taifas (principalities) in Iberia after the collapse of the Caliphate of Cordoba in 1031. For example, Mujāhid al-ʿĀmirī organized the Saqaliba in Dénia to rebel, seize control of the city, and establish the Taifa of Dénia (1010–1227), which extended its reach as far as the island of Majorca.

Saqalabid dynasties

Valencia

 Muhārak and Muẓaffar: 1010/11–1017/18
 to Tortosa: 1017/18–1020/21
 ʿAbd al-ʿAzīz ibn ʿAbd al-Raḥmān ibn Abī ʿĀmir al-Manṣūr, son of Sanchuelo: 1020/21–1060
 ʿAbd al-Malik ibn ʿAbd al-ʿAzīz Niẓām al-Dawla al-Muẓaffar, son of prec.: 1060–1065
 to the Dhuʾl-Nūnids: 1065–1075
 Abū Bakr ibn ʿAbd al-ʿAzīz al-Manṣūr, brother of prec.: 1075–1085
 ʿUthmān ibn Abī Bakr al-Qāḍī, son of prec.: 1085
 to the Dhuʾl-Nūnids

Dénia
Mujāhid was a member of Muḥammad ibn Abi ʿĀmir's household.

 Mujāhid ibn ʿAbd Allāh al-ʿĀmiri al-Muwaffaq: c.1012–1045
 ʿAlī ibn Mujāhid Iqbāl al-Dawla: 1045–1076
 to the Hūdids

Tortosa
 Labib al-Fata al-Saqlabi (Valencia 1017–1019): c. 1009–bfr. 1039/40
 Muqatil Sayf al-Milla: bfr. 1039/40–1053/4
 Ya'la: 1053/4–1057/8
 Nabil: 1057/8–1060
 To Zaragoza: 1060–1081 or 2/3

Almeria
 1012 Aflah.
 1014 Khayran. Slavic slave from Cordoba Caliph palace, who dedicated his rule to the development of Almería.
 1028 Zuhayr, also a former Slavic slave from Cordoba
 1038 Abu Bakr al-Ramimi
 1038 Abd al-Aziz al-Mansur, al-Mansur's grandson, King of Valencia

From 1038 to 1041 Almería belonged to the Taifa of Valencia.

Usage
Geographer Ibn Khordadbeh (840–880) claimed that the Bulgar ruling title was "King of the Saqāliba" prior to the mid 7th century, meaning that the ruler held "a reservoir of potential slaves".
Traveller Ibn Fadlan (fl. 921–22) called the ruler of Volga Bulgaria the "King of the Saqaliba".
Polymath Abu Zayd al-Balkhi (850–934) described three main centers of the Saqaliba: Kuyaba, Slawiya, and Artania.
Traveller Ibrahim ibn Yaqub ( 961–62) placed the Saqāliba, Slavs, west of Bulgaria and east of other Slavs, in a mountainous land, and described them as violent and aggressive. It is believed that these were situated in the Western Balkans.

See also
Ghilman
Mamluk
Devshirme
Janissary

Notes

References

Sources

External links
Barry Hoberman, "Treasures of the North"
"Slavs in Muslim Spain"

Slavs of the medieval Islamic world
Slavic history
Mercenary units and formations
Medieval Serbia
History of Poland during the Piast dynasty
Arabic words and phrases
Slave trade
Islam and slavery
Arabian slaves and freedmen
Expatriate military units and formations
Military units and formations of the medieval Islamic world
Slavery in Al-Andalus
Slaves from the Abbasid Caliphate
Slavery